Brigadier John Holthouse  (19 April  1891-1964) was a South African military commander.

He joined the Royal Air Force in 1918 and transferred to the South African Air Force in January 1921.

He became the Air Forces Camp Commandant at Robert Heights and OC of the Aircraft and Artillery Depot on 1 May 1933. From 1936 he served with the Railways and Harbours Air Service.

He served as Director of Air Services from 13 September 1939 to 3 November 1939 and then Director General Air Services from 4 November 1939 to 25 November 1940.

In World War II he was Air and Military Attache in the United States.

He left the Union Defence Force on 31 October 1945.

References

See also
List of South African military chiefs
South African Air Force

|-

1891 births
1964 deaths
Chiefs of the South African Air Force
Officers of the Order of the British Empire
Military attachés